Clayton Hall in the Clayton area of Manchester, England, is a tram stop on the East Manchester Line (EML) of Transport for Greater Manchester's light-rail Metrolink system. The station opened on 11 February 2013, after a three-day free trial for local residents. The station was constructed as part of Phase 3a of the Metrolink's expansion.

Services

Services are mostly every 12 minutes on all routes.

Connecting bus routes
Clayton Hall is served by buses stopping nearby on Ashton New Road. Stagecoach Manchester services 216 and 231 both run between Manchester and Ashton with the 216 replicating the tram route to Droylsden before continuing via Audenshaw, while the 231 runs via Littlemoss and Smallshaw. The 231 is also operated by First Greater Manchester during the evening. Stagecoach's 171 service runs between Newton Heath and East Didsbury via Openshaw, Gorton and Levenshulme, while M Travel's 188 service also runs via Openshaw and Gorton on its route between Manchester and Ryder Brow.

References

External links

Clayton Hall Stop Information
Clayton Hall area map
 Light Rail Transit Association

Tram stops in Manchester
Tram stops on the Bury to Ashton-under-Lyne line